Vollerwiek (North Frisian: Folerwiik) is a municipality in the district of Nordfriesland, in Schleswig-Holstein, Germany.

See also
 Eiderstedt Peninsula

References

Nordfriesland